Bivolino, founded in 1954, is a Belgian clothing manufacturer, specialized in customized shirts. Bivolino.com was founded by the brothers Louis and Jacques Byvoet. On 13 October 1987 the company was passed over to Michel Byvoet.

History
Brothers Louis and Jacques Byvoet founded the company in 1954 with a joint investment of 8 million Belgian franks.. Their grandfather, Jacques Byvoet, had been in the linen trade since 1900 and the name Bivolino was chosen to represent both the family name of Byvoet and linen. They based the company in Hasselt – Belgium. Under the direction of the Byvoet brothers, the company, a small plant with 80 employees, produced 350.000 shirts a year. At this point, export to the Netherlands, Luxemburg, Germany and Switzerland represented 35% of the business. 
In 1969, Bivolino introduced a new ergonomic measurement system, allowing each shirt to be individually fitted to the body. This system was the first of its kind in Europe, and was created in partnership with IBM. In 1981, Bivolino became the first shirt label to take steps towards computerised production, which automatically produces the pattern making gradations. By now, and using this technology, Bivolino was producing 900.000 shirts a year and employing 270 people. On 13 October 1987 a fire ruined the Bivolino plant in Hasselt. Over the next year, sales decreased by 80%. As the company struggled to recover, production was moved to Tunisia and Romania.

During this time, the Byvoet brothers decided to pass on the family business to Louis’ son, Michel Byvoet. 
The growth of the internet opened up new possibilities for Bivolino and the brand established a new digital studio at the Limburg Science Park. In 1997 the first shirt was sold via their online shop, Bivolino.com. In 2000, after two years of anthropometric research, Bivolino launched their biometric sizing technology (Patent nr EEC-EP1341427 & US-7346421) http://www.google.ch/patents/WO2002035952A3?cl=en, which could calculate the cut and size for every Bivolino customer, without using a measurement tape. In 2010, Bivolino launched its latest piece of technology, a 3D shirt design platform. See www.BivolinoServices.com .The tool was developed under the Open Garments research project, and was supported by European Commission research funds. .. In 2016 a bridge between Art and Bespoke Fashion was made whereas visual artists upload designs to be printed on shirts.  New patent BE1024802-filed 2019 by inventor Michel Byvoet "System Integration for Design & production of online Clothing".

Bivolino is mostly using fabrics from reliable italian weavers: Monti, Albini, Canclini, Thomas Mason, David & John Anderson......Bivolino's manufacturing standards matches the Luxury Italian make. A strong partnership with Tunesian Tailoring Manufacturing companies guarantees a perfect fit and outstanding quality. Bivolino collaborates with 50 italian influencers.

December 2021:Bivolino.com launches first-ever transport carbon footprint calculator for his bespoke shirts. Customized shirts as the ultimate sustainable alternative to fast-fashion! Made-to-measure and bespoke feels like a refreshing dive into a more innovative, caring and sustainable future for fashion. Made to measure shirts produced on demand and delivered by sea and road generate a very reasonable 1.6 kg/CO² emission per shirt, three times lower than mass produced shirts. This study has been conducted by Ecolife.be. https://www.ecolife.be Off-the-rack shirts produced in far-east, transported by sea and sold through webshops or stores has a respectively 2.7 kg CO² and 4.2 kg CO² footprint, considering an average of 25% returns. ‘Flying-in’ shirts from far-east has an even more negative impact on the environment with a transport carbon footprint of 6.8 kg CO². As a single tree can absorb CO² at a rate of 20 kg/year, we need to plant one tree to offset carbon emissions for each dozen made to measure shirt and for each four mass produced shirts. https://www.bivolino.com/en/blog-sustainability

Michel Byvoet kids are trilled to keep up going - family business since 1833, symbolised by the squirrel!

Visual Identity (logo)

Awards 
In 2004, Bivolino was given the Starter Award from the Dutch home shopping association, Thuiswinkel.org. In 2006, the company was awarded the BeCommerce Award by the Belgian home shopping association, BeCommerce.

Leadership 
 1946-1953: Widow Alphonse Byvoet
1954 - 1987: Louis & Jacques Byvoet
 1987 - now: Michel Byvoet

External links 
 
 http://www.open-garments.eu/
 https://bijvoet.org/content/
 Funny graphic tees
 https://web.archive.org/web/20110128194702/http://www.byvoet.com/
 http://www.iart.clothing/
 https://www.bivolinoservices.com/
https://www.ecolife.be

References 

Clothing companies of Belgium
Clothing manufacturers
Companies based in Limburg (Belgium)